John Martin-Dye (21 May 1940 – 31 December 2022) was a retired British swimmer.

Swimming career
He won a silver medal in the 4 × 100 m freestyle relay at the 1962 European Aquatics Championships. He competed in four freestyle events at the 1960 and 1964 Summer Olympics; his best achievements were fourth place in the 4 × 200 m relay in 1960 and seventh place in the 4 × 100 m relay in 1964. The fourth place in 1960 was good enough for a new European record.

He represented England and won two bronze medals in the 440 yards freestyle relay and the 880 yards freestyle relay, at the 1962 British Empire and Commonwealth Games in Perth, Western Australia.

Four years later he won another bronze medal in the 440 yards freestyle relay, at the 1966 British Empire and Commonwealth Games in Kingston, Jamaica.

He won the 1961 ASA British National Championship 110 yards freestyle title, the 220 yards freestyle title, was three times winner of the 440 Yards freestyle (1960, 1961, 1963) and the 1963 mile champion.

Water polo
He started swimming in 1948 at Penguin Swimming Club in Shepherd's Bush. He was not only a swimmer, but also competed for Great Britain in water polo. Around 1966 he moved to Watford where he coaches the local water polo team. His youngest son Graham is also a swimmer and water polo player; he competed in Australia, but in 2012 was a captain of the Watford polo team.

See also
 List of Commonwealth Games medallists in swimming (men)

References

1940 births
2022 deaths
Swimmers at the 1960 Summer Olympics
Swimmers at the 1964 Summer Olympics
Olympic swimmers of Great Britain
English male freestyle swimmers
European Aquatics Championships medalists in swimming
Swimmers at the 1962 British Empire and Commonwealth Games
Swimmers at the 1966 British Empire and Commonwealth Games
Commonwealth Games medallists in swimming
Commonwealth Games bronze medallists for England
Medallists at the 1962 British Empire and Commonwealth Games
Medallists at the 1966 British Empire and Commonwealth Games